The Boats that Built Britain is a British documentary television series directed by Lawrence Walford and produced by Form Films for the BBC. Presented by sailor and writer Tom Cunliffe, it covers various significant ships in the maritime history of Britain. The show was broadcast in 6 episodes, first broadcast on BBC Four from 4 May 2010, before starting on BBC Two from 15 May 2010. The show was produced in conjunction with an exhibition at the National Maritime Museum.

Episodes
 "The Matthew" - Cunliffe sails a replica of Matthew, sailed by John Cabot in 1497, the first Western boat to discover America
 "The Phoenix" - Cunliffe sails Phoenix, a 1929 Danish built example of the archetypal 'square rigger', crucial to the rise in 19th century British trade
 "The Reaper" - Cunliffe sails the restored 1901 built Reaper, the biggest sailing lugger ever to fish the seas
 "Bristol Channel Pilot Cutter" - Cunliffe sails the 1904 built Cariad, an example of a Bristol Channel Pilot Cutter, considered by many to be the finest sailing boat design ever
 "World War Two Landing Craft" - Cunliffe sails an LCVP (Landing Craft Vehicle and Personnel), the 'one boat did more to win World War II than any other piece of machinery'

References

External links

Boats that Built Britain at the National Maritime Museum

2010 British television series debuts
2010 British television series endings
2010s British documentary television series
BBC television documentaries about history
English-language television shows
Documentary films about water transport
Television series about the history of the United Kingdom
Maritime history of the United Kingdom
Works of maritime history